Lindau-Insel station ("Lindau island") (Lindau Stadt until 15 May 1936 and then Lindau Hauptbahnhof until 12 December 2020) is the largest station in the city of Lindau (Bodensee) and was its most important station until passenger service resumed at Lindau-Reutin station on December 13, 2020. In the urban area there is also Lindau-Aeschach station and Lindau-Reutin freight yard. Formerly there were also Lindau-Siebertsdorf (called Lindau-Zech until 15 May 1936), Lindau Langenweg, Lindau Strandbad, Schoenau, Oberreitnau and Rehlings.

Location
Lindau-Insel is a railway terminus and lies on the island of Lindau in the immediate vicinity of Lindau harbour. The current station building, which is protected as a monument, was built between 1913 and 1921 in the Art Nouveau style.

The station is about 500 metres long and is connected by a four-track line running over an embankment to the mainland. The embankment and the parallel Seebrücke road bridge, which is about 500 metres to the east, form the perimeter of the so-called Kleinen See (small lake), which lies between the suburb of Aeschach and the island. On the west side of the station there is a small marshalling yard and the former depot. Meanwhile, some workshops in the rear are still used for vehicle maintenance.

The railway lines separate the districts of Hauptinsel (main island) from the Hinteren Insel (rear island). However, a pedestrian bridge and the Thiersch road bridge run above the tracks.

History 
Lindau is the terminus of the Buchloe–Lindau railway, running from  via Kempten. Its southeastern section from Oberstaufen to Lindau was completed on 1 September 1853. From 1869 to 1939 there was a ferry port for the carriage of freight wagons to Romanshorn and from 1873 to 1899 to Konstanz. In 1899, the Friedrichshafen–Lindau railway was opened from Radolfzell via Friedrichshafen. The Vorarlberg Railway runs from Lindau via Bregenz, Dornbirn and Feldkirch to Bludenz and is operated by the Austrian Federal Railways (ÖBB). As a result, Lindau is also a border station. Formerly the ÖBB had its own ticket office in Lindau station; this was replaced by ticket machines, which still exist.

The route to Bludenz was electrified on 14 December 1954. Electrification of a section of Buchloe–Lindau railway was completed in December 2021, completing an electrified route to Munich via . Electrification of the route to Friedrichshafen was completed at the same time. In Lindau station, tracks 1 to 3 are electrified.

Operations

Long-distance passenger services 
From December 2010 to December 2013, a Railjet was operated daily to Lindau. The counter train ran as a regional express to Bregenz with a stop in Lochau-Hörbranz and from Bregenz as a Railjet to Vienna, as the Railjet replaced a regular regional express or an S-Bahn on the Lindau-Bregenz route. In earlier years, ÖBB also operated express trains (Ex) to Lindau, including direct connections to the Austrian capital Vienna. Today, the Austrian long-distance trains mostly end or begin in neighboring Bregenz.

In long-distance passenger rail services, Eurocity Line 88 offered regular connections from Munich via Lindau to Zurich until 12 December 2020. On the Eurocity trains, the locomotive changeover between German diesel and Swiss electric traction was carried out at Lindau-Insel station. The Munich - Lindau connection via Memmingen was electrified to enable continuous operation under catenary. Since 13 December 2020, the Munich-Zurich trains, now called EuroCity-Express, have served Lindau-Reutin station instead.

Regional services

City buses 
Bus routes 1 and 2 of Stadtbus Lindau operate from the station forecourt to all part of the city of Lindau.

Gallery

References

External links 
 
 

Railway stations in Lindau (Bodensee)
Art Nouveau architecture in Germany
Railway stations in Germany opened in 1853
Art Nouveau railway stations
Buildings and structures completed in 1921
Buildings and structures in Lindau (district)
Vorarlberg S-Bahn stations